NGC 429 is a lenticular galaxy of type S0^0: located in the constellation Cetus. It was discovered on December 20, 1786 by William Herschel. It was described by Dreyer as "very faint, very small."

References

External links
 

0429
17861220
Cetus (constellation)
Lenticular galaxies
004368